Nambo-Namna  is a Yam language spoken in Western Province, Papua New Guinea. The two varieties are mutually intelligible. They are, 
Nambo (Nmbo, Nambu, Nombuio, Tanjuamu, Keraki) 
Namna (Tendavi)

References

Further reading 

 
 
 

Nambu languages
Languages of Western Province (Papua New Guinea)